Datu Sajid Islam Uy Ampatuan is a Filipino politician who served as governor of Maguindanao.

Career
Sajid Ampatuan was elected as vice governor of Maguindanao in the 2004 elections while his father Andal Ampatuan Sr. was elected as governor of the province. Ampatuan Sr. resigned in 2008 with Sajid succeeding him. Sajid Ampatuan himself vacated the office following the Maguindanao massacre on November 2009 in the municipality of Ampatuan. He and his brothers Zaldy, Anwar and Andal Jr., and brother-in-law Akmad were implicated to the massacre and were detained. He was released on bail in March 2015 and acquitted in 2019.

Tasked by his father to lead the "reunification" of the Ampatuan political clan, Sajid Ampatuan would run for the position of mayor of Shariff Aguak in the 2016 elections under the United Nationalist Alliance. He lost his mayoral bid.

In 2017, several corruption charges were filed against Sajid Ampatuan which is connected to his tenure as acting governor of Maguindanao from 2008 to 2009.

He would get elected as vice mayor of Shariff Saydona Mustapha in the 2022 elections. He ran under the Nacionalista Party.

In October 2022, Ampatuan was sentenced to a maximum of 170 years of imprisonment by the Sandiganbayan for violations of the anti-graft and corrupt practices act and for malversation of public funds through falsification of public documents.

In January 2023, he was convicted of the same charges in connection with several ghost road rehabilitation projects, with a prison sentence of 64–112 years in total. He was also ordered arrested by the Sandiganbayan for his failure to attend on the promulgation of the decision. Five engineers were also convicted of falsification charges as well.

Personal life
Ampatuan is married to Bai Zandria Sinsuat, who served as mayor of Shariff Saydona Mustapha.

References

 

Governors of former provinces of the Philippines
Governors of Maguindanao
Mayors of places in Maguindanao
Sajid
United Nationalist Alliance politicians
Nacionalista Party politicians
Year of birth missing (living people)
Living people